Rodine pri Trebnjem is a small village northeast of Trebnje in eastern Slovenia. The area is part of the historical region of Lower Carniola. The Municipality of Trebnje is now included in the Southeast Slovenia Statistical Region.

Name
The name of the settlement was changed from Rodine to Rodine pri Trebnjem in 1955. The plural name Rodine and names like it (e.g., Male Rodne, Velike Rodne) are derived from the common noun *rodina 'untilled land', thus referring to a local geographical feature.

Cultural heritage
Two Iron Age burial mounds over 10 m in diameter have been identified near the settlement.

References

External links
Rodine pri Trebnjem at Geopedia

Populated places in the Municipality of Trebnje